Bedotiinae are a subfamily of the rainbowfish family Melanotaeniidae, commonly known as the Madagascar rainbowfish, Madagascan rainbowfish, or Malagasy rainbowfish due to their endemism to Madagascar. It includes two genera, Bedotia and Rheocles.

Anatomy and morphology
As the common name rainbowfish implies, they are generally colorful fishes. Bedotiins are elongated, laterally compressed, and rarely exceed 100 mm in standard length. Bedotiins exhibit varying degrees of sexual dimorphism, which is quite pronounced in some species. The anal fin spine is weak or absent.

Distribution
The entire family of Bedotiidae is endemic to Madagascar. Bedotiins occur exclusively in freshwater environments and are distributed in small to medium-sized forested rivers and streams, occasionally in swamps and marshes, spanning nearly the entire eastern slope of Madagascar (R. derhami is recorded from a westward draining Sofia River basin in the northeast of the island).

Bedotiin fishes are under severe threat because of rapid deforestation and habitat modification throughout most of their range. Because Bedotia and Rheocles are generally the first to exhibit population declines or disappear from areas where habitat is moderately to highly disturbed or degraded, they are reliable indicators of ecosystem health and stability.

Taxonomy
This subfamily includes the two genera Bedotia and Rheocles, with at least 16 species. This subfamily is monophyletic. This group is considered by Nelson, 2016 Fishes of the World to be a subfamily of the family Melanotaeniidae. When treated as a family it has been placed by some authorities in a suborder Melanotaenioidei which includes the sister groups Bedotiidae and Melanotaeniidae, as well as Pseudomugilidae (including Telmatherininae). The sister-group relationship between these taxa is most parsimoniously explained by the break-up of Gondwana.

References

 
Melanotaeniidae
Taxa named by Charles Tate Regan
Endemic fauna of Madagascar
Fish families